Monaro may refer to:
 Monaro (New South Wales), a region in the south of the Australian state
 Division of Eden-Monaro, federal electorate 
 Electoral district of Monaro, state electorate
 Monaro Highway, the main state highway from Canberra to the Monaro region 
 Holden Monaro, an automobile manufactured by Holden, the Australian branch of General Motors, taking its name from the region
 Chevrolet Lumina Coupe, Middle East model
 Pontiac GTO, American model
 Vauxhall Monaro, UK model

See also
Monarto (disambiguation)